Mary Lawrence may refer to:

 Mary Lawrence (sculptor) (1868–1945), American sculptor
 Mary Lawrence (actress) (1918–1991), American actress
 Mary Wells Lawrence (born 1928), American advertising executive
 Carmen Mary Lawrence (born 1948), former Premier of Western Australia
 Mary Lawrence (1896–1975), New Zealand religious sister earlier known as the portrait artist Julia Lynch

See also
 Lawrence (surname)
 Lawrence (disambiguation)